Rudolph Benz (1847 - 1906) was an architect in the United States. He immigrated from Germany. He lived at 201 Rapier Avenue in Mobile. He was buried at Magnolia Cemetery

Works
Mobile Cotton Exchange (1886), burned in 1917
Baldwin County Courthouse (1887) in Daphne, Alabama
Mobile County Courthouse (1889), its fifth, demolished in 1950s
Pincus Building (1891) on Dauphin Street
Scheuermann Building (1893), at 203 Dauphin Street
German Relief Hall  (1896)
J. F. Hutchinson mansion
Bienville Square fountain
Pollock Building (1907) at 412 Dauphin, NRHP listed Street

References

External links
Findagrave entry

Architects from Alabama
1906 deaths
1847 births